The Jigawa ethanol program is a program to produce ethanol from agricultural products in Jigawa, Nigeria. The ethanol programme was initiated by the Nigerian President, Olusegun Obasanjo, to process sugarcane into biofuel. Besides sugarcane, the Nigerian Government plans to start processing cassava as well.

External links

Jigawa to flag off ethanol programme, Vanguard, January 30, 2006
FG to make use of ethanol in fuel compulsory, Business Day,  September 8, 2006
 http://www.unep.org/cpi/briefs/2006Apr10.doc
Nigeria to create 1 million jobs in biofuels sector Biopact, April 7, 2006
Nigeria will use Brazilian blueprint to found its new biofuels industry Ecoworld, July 7, 2006
Natural Resources Incorporated homepage of the company investing in the project.

Ethanol fuel
Agriculture in Nigeria
Biofuel in Nigeria